Erythranthe guttata, with the common names seep monkeyflower and common yellow monkeyflower, is a yellow bee-pollinated annual or perennial plant. It was formerly known as Mimulus guttatus.

Erythranthe guttata is a model organism for biological studies, and in that context is still referred to as Mimulus guttatus. There may be as many as 1000 scientific papers focused on this species. The genome is (as of 2012) being studied in depth.

For combined research of evolution, genetics, and ecology, particularly plant-insect interactions, the yellow monkeyflower has become a model system. With the help of physically resistant protections called trichomes, which have been thoroughly examined, the yellow monkeyflower defends itself against herbivores.

Description

A highly variable plant, taking many forms, E. guttata is a species complex in that there is room to treat some of its forms as different species by some definitions.

The perennial form spreads with stolons or rhizomes. The stem may be erect or recumbent. In the latter form, roots may develop at leaf nodes. Sometimes dwarfed, it may be hairless or have some hairs.

Leaves are opposite, round to oval, usually coarsely and irregularly toothed or lobed. The bright yellow flowers are born on a raceme, most often with five or more flowers.

The calyx has five lobes that are much shorter than the flower. Each flower has bilateral symmetry and has two lips. The upper lip usually has two lobes; the lower, three. The lower lip may have one large to many small red to reddish brown spots (hence the name guttata, which is Latin for 'spotted'). The opening to the flower is hairy.

Erythranthe guttata is pollinated by bees, such as Bombus species. Inbreeding reduces flower quantity and size and pollen quality and quantity. E. guttata also displays a high degree of self-pollination. Erythranthe nasuta (Mimulus nasutus) evolved from E. guttata in central California between 200,000 and 500,000 years ago and since then has become primarily a self-pollinator. Other differences have occurred since then, such as genetic code variations and variations in plant morphology. E. guttata prefers a wetter habitat than E. nasuta.

Distribution and habitat
Both annual and perennial forms occur throughout the species' range. It blooms during spring at low elevations, during summer at high elevations.

It is found in a wide range of habitats including the splash zone of the Pacific Ocean, the chaparral of California, Western U.S. deserts, the geysers of Yellowstone National Park, alpine meadows, serpentine barrens, and even on the toxic tailings of copper mines. It is also very common in New Zealand near water bodies.

Cultivation
Erythranthe guttata is cultivated in the specialty horticulture trade and available as an ornamental plant for: traditional gardens; natural landscape, native plant, and habitat gardens.

Uses
The leaves are edible, both raw and cooked. Leaves are sometimes added to salads as a lettuce substitute, they have a slight bitter flavour.

References

External links

 Calflora: Mimulus guttatus'' (Seep Monkey Flower,  Yellow Monkey Flower, common yellow monkeyflower)
  University of Michigan - Dearborn, Native American Ethnobotany:
 Mimulus Genome Browser - for genetics researchers
 Mimulus guttatus — UC Photos gallery

guttata
Flora of the Northwestern United States
Flora of the Southwestern United States
Flora of Western Canada
Flora of the West Coast of the United States
Flora of British Columbia
Flora of California
Flora of the California desert regions
Flora of the Sierra Nevada (United States)
Natural history of the California chaparral and woodlands
Plant models
Garden plants of North America
Freshwater plants
Leaf vegetables
Flora without expected TNC conservation status